Joseph Kishore (born 1980) is an American activist and writer. He is the National Secretary of the Socialist Equality Party (SEP) and a writer for the World Socialist Web Site.

Career
In 2008, Kishore was first elected National Secretary of the SEP. and re-elected at SEP Congresses held in 2010, 2012, 2014, 2016, and 2018.

In 2020, Kishore was the presidential nominee of the SEP in 2020 United States presidential election. His running mate was Norissa Santa Cruz. He received only 350 votes nationally, making him one of the least successful candidates in that election.

Works
Kishore writes and comments on both American and international matters, as well as on science. He has written and commented extensively on US labor struggles, including the auto industry and public education, as well as the history of the socialist movement. Kishore participated in the Workers Inquiry into the Bankruptcy of Detroit.
Writings
 The Historical and International Foundations of the Socialist Equality Party (US) with David North
 The Crisis of the World Capitalist System: The Perspectives and Tasks of the Socialist Equality Party 2008-2010
 The Defense of Culture and the Crisis in Detroit

See also
 David North (socialist)
 Socialist Equality Party (United States)

References

External sources
 Federal Election Commission: TANNIRU, JOSEPH KISHORE
 WSWS:  Joseph Kishore
 Mehring Books:  Joseph Kishore

Living people
Socialist Equality Party (United States) politicians
1980 births
Candidates in the 2020 United States presidential election